was a Japanese animation design studio formed in 1978. It went bankrupt and was liquidated in 1997. AIC RIGHTS now holds the intellectual property of most of Artmic's titles. The studio was founded by Toshimichi Suzuki after he left Tatsunoko Productions in 1978. The company's name is short for "Art and Modern Ideology for Creation".

Members 
 Kenichi Sonoda
 Shinji Aramaki
 Kimitoshi Yamane
 Hideki Kakinuma

Works

OVAs 
 1985: Genesis Climber Mospeada: Love, Live, Alive (with Tatsunoko)
 1990: Sengoku Busho Retsuden Bakufu Doji Hissatsuman (with Watanabe Promotion)
 1991: Bubblegum Crash (with Artland)
 1993: Crimson Wolf (with A.P.P.P.)
 1993–1994: Casshan: Robot Hunter (with Tatsunoko)
 1994: Genocyber (with Artland)
 1994–1995: Gatchaman (with Tatsunoko)
 1995: Battle Skipper (with Tokyo Kids)
 1996: Hikarian (with Tokyo Kids)
 1996–1998: Power Dolls (with OLM)

In partnership with AIC
 1986: Wanna-Be's
 1986–1988: Gall Force trilogy
 1987–1991: Bubblegum Crisis
 1987–1989: Dangaioh
 1987: Metal Skin Panic MADOX-01
 1988–1990: Hades Project Zeorymer
 1989: Riding Bean
 1989: Megazone 23 III
 1990: A.D. Police Files
 1990–1991: The Hakkenden (first season)
 1991–1993: Detonator Orgun
 1992–1993: Gaiarth The Genesis Survivor
 1992: Scramble Wars

Animated feature films 
 1982: The Wizard of Oz (with Topcraft)
 1982: Techno Police 21C (with Studio Nue)

Television series 
 1983: Genesis Climber Mospeada (with Tatsunoko)
 1984: Super High Speed Galvion (with Kokusai Eigasha and Studio Robin)

External links

Anime International Company
Mass media companies disestablished in 1997
Mass media companies established in 1978
Defunct mass media companies of Japan
Japanese animation studios
Japanese companies established in 1978
Companies that have filed for bankruptcy in Japan
Japanese companies disestablished in 1997